Wandsworth London Borough Council is the local authority for the London Borough of Wandsworth in Greater London, England. It is a London borough council, one of 32 in the United Kingdom capital of London. Wandsworth is divided into 20 wards, each electing three councillors. After the May 2022 election, 35 of these councillors were Labour and 22 were Conservatives, with 1 independent. The Conservatives had an overall majority on the council since 1978, until Labour won control in the 2022 election.

History

There have been many local authorities responsible for the area. The current local authority was first elected in 1964, a year before formally coming into its powers and prior to the creation of the London Borough of Wandsworth on 1 April 1965. Wandsworth replaced the Metropolitan Borough of Wandsworth and about half of the Metropolitan Borough of Battersea, the rest being the former civil parishes of Clapham and Streatham, becoming the south of the London Borough of Lambeth.

It was envisaged that through the London Government Act 1963 Wandsworth as a London local authority would share power with the Greater London Council. The split of powers and functions meant that the Greater London Council was responsible for "wide area" services such as fire, ambulance, flood prevention, and refuse disposal; with the local authorities responsible for "personal" services such as social care, libraries, cemeteries and refuse collection. This arrangement lasted until 1986 when Wandsworth London Borough Council gained responsibility for some services that had been provided by the Greater London Council, such as waste disposal. Wandsworth became an education authority in 1990. Since 2000 the Greater London Authority has taken some responsibility for highways and planning control from the council, but within the English local government system the council remains a "most purpose" authority in terms of the available range of powers and functions.

From 1992 to 2011, Wandsworth was an early adopter of 'Thatcherite' policies of privatisation of street cleaning and refuse collection, and sale of council housing, under the leadership of Edward Lister.  Between 2007 and 2010 11% of the "affordable" homes built in Wandsworth were for social rent – the lowest in the whole of London. Many ex-council homes became owned by concentrated and absent private landlords.

Powers and functions
The local authority derives its powers and functions from the London Government Act 1963 and subsequent legislation, and has the powers and functions of a London borough council. It sets council tax and as a billing authority also collects precepts for Greater London Authority functions and business rates. It sets planning policies which complement Greater London Authority and national policies, and decides on almost all planning applications accordingly.  It is a local education authority  and is also responsible for council housing, social services, libraries, waste collection and disposal, traffic, and most roads and environmental health.

Finances
Wandsworth London Borough Council is the billing authority for Council Tax, and collects precepts on behalf of the Mayor's Office for Policing and Crime, the London Fire and Emergency Planning Authority the Greater London Authority and Transport for London.

Summary results of elections

The Labour Party won the first election in 1964, and also in 1971 and 1974. In plenary votes and committee-leading the Conservative Party held power from 1978 until 2022, when Labour regained control after 48 years.

See also
Wandsworth Plus Credit Union

References

Local authorities in London
London borough councils
Politics of the London Borough of Wandsworth
Elections in the London Borough of Wandsworth
Leader and cabinet executives
Local education authorities in England
Billing authorities in England